Olga Vitalyevna Kuragina (born 21 April 1959) is a former Soviet track and field athlete who competed mainly in the pentathlon.

She competed for the USSR in the 1980 Summer Olympics held in Moscow,  in the Pentathlon where she won the bronze medal behind team mates Nadiya Tkachenko and Olga Rukavishnikova for a Soviet clean sweep in the last Olympic pentathlon competition, after 1980 the women competed in the heptathlon event instead.

References

Living people
1959 births
Russian pentathletes
Soviet pentathletes
Olympic athletes of the Soviet Union
Olympic bronze medalists for the Soviet Union
Athletes (track and field) at the 1980 Summer Olympics
Russian female athletes
Soviet female athletes
Medalists at the 1980 Summer Olympics
Olympic bronze medalists in athletics (track and field)